Murat Yaçıntaş is a business man and civic leader in Istanbul, Turkey.

Yalçıntaş began his education (1977–1984) at Saint Joseph French Lycée in Istanbul. He studied mechanical engineering at Boğaziçi University and holds a Joint master's degree (1988–1990) from Boston University and Vrije Universiteit Brussel in Corporate Management. He completed his Ph.D. at the Faculty of Management, Istanbul University, focusing on customer service in the service industry. A father of three, Dr. Yalçıntaş speaks fluent English and French and intermediate German and Arabic.

Experience

Throughout his career, Dr. Murat Yalçıntaş has held various positions at different institutions and organizations, including the following:

2009 – Vice-President of the Union of Chambers and Commodity Exchanges of Turkey (TOBB)
2009 – Istanbul Chamber of Commerce (ICOC) Committee Member (Sanitation System and Climate Control Committee)
2007 – President of the Association of the Mediterranean Chambers of Commerce and Industry (ASCAME)
2007 – Vice-President of the Turkish Wushu Federation
2006 – President of the Istanbul Convention Visitors Bureau (ICVB)
2006 – President of the Tourism Development and Education Foundation (TUGEV)
2005 – Member of the Istanbul Commerce University (İTİCÜ) Board of Trustees
2005 – Deputy Chairman of the Board of Directors of the Istanbul World Trade Center
2005 – President of the Istanbul Chamber of Commerce (ICOC),
2005 - 2009 Istanbul Chamber of Commerce (ICOC) Committee Member (Metal Goods Branch Committee)
2001 - 2005 Vice-President of the Justice and Development Party (AK Party), Istanbul Province
2001 – Member of the AK Party Board of Founders
2001–2003 Istanbul Chamber of Commerce (ICOC) Metal Goods Branch Committee Member
1998 - 2001 Vice-President of the Fazilet (Virtue) Party, Istanbul Province
1996 - 1998 Member of the Board of Directors of the Independent Industrialists and Businessmen Association (MÜSİAD)
1995 - 2001 Istanbul Chamber of Commerce (ICOC) Committee Member (Metal Goods Branch Committee Member)
1991 - 1994 Islamic Development Bank, Project Head, Jeddah
1989 - 1990 European Union Research Specialist, Brussels

Honors

Murat Yalçıntaş has received various awards, some of which are listed below:

2010 - France / Légion d'Honneur
2010 - Italy State Medal, Commendatore
2009 - Kyrgyzstan Presidential Academy, Honorary Professor
2009 - Istanbul Social Sciences High School, Economist of the Year Award
2008 - Istanbul Exporters Association, Honor Award for Export Service
2008 - TRUE Avrupa Dergisi (TRUE Europe Magazine), Honor Plaque
2008 - Istanbul Governor's Office, Honor Award
2006 - Platin Ekonomi Dergisi (Platinum Economics Magazine) Social Responsibility Award
2006 - GAP Journalists Association, Association President of the Year Award
2006 - Siyaset Dergisi (Politics Magazine), Association President of the Year Award
2000 - Independent Industrialists and Businessmen Association (MÜSİAD), Certificate of Achievement

References

External links

Living people
Turkish businesspeople
1965 births
Turkish mechanical engineers
St. Joseph High School Istanbul alumni